Lock and Dam No. 19 is a lock and dam located on the Upper Mississippi River near Keokuk, Iowa. In 2004, the facility was listed in the National Register of Historic Places as Lock and Dam No. 19 Historic District, #04000179 covering , 7 buildings, 12 structures, 1 object. The lock is owned and operated by the U.S. Army Corps of Engineers.  The dam is owned and operated by Ameren Missouri.

The lock and dam obliterated the Des Moines Rapids which had effectively been the northern barrier for traffic on the Mississippi until efforts began in 1837 to address the Mississippi's  depth in the rapids.

Locks

It was put into operation in 1957 at a cost of 13.5 million dollars. The 1957 lock replaced a 1910-1913 lock.

The lock and dam, as well as the rest of the river, can be viewed from a distance on the Observation Deck of the Keokuk Rail Bridge.

Dam

Construction of the dam began in 1910, and was completed in 1913. The gates are either installed or removed and river flow is controlled by the number of gates installed. They are removed by a gantry crane that travels on the service bridge above the dam. At the time it was completed it was second in length only to the Aswan Low Dam on the Nile River.

Powerhouse

Construction began in 1910 and when completed in 1913 it was the largest capacity, single powerhouse electricity generating plant in the world. The Power House and spillways are owned and operated by Ameren Missouri and has a 142 MW capacity. The powerhouse contains 15 generators, originally designed to produce 25 Hz instead of the 60 Hz alternating current used today.   Keokuk and Hamilton Water Power landed contracts in 1910 to deliver 44.7 MW of electricity to three customers located in St. Louis, MO (more than 100 miles downstream), at a time when no electric power had been transmitted more than a few miles: The Union Electric Light and Power Company, Laclede Gas Company and United Railways Company, which operated the St. Louis Street Railway Company.  Union Electric Co. purchased the facilities in 1925.  The 25 Hz generators powered industrial customers and used for the Streetcars in St. Louis, Missouri.

After World War II, a number of modernization improvements were undertaken.  The 25-cycle generators were progressively converted to 60-cycle generators beginning in 1940s with the final units converted in 2002.  Electronic automation replacement for some mechanical systems began in 1980s.  Ameren Missouri, the current powerhouse owner, began replacement and conversion of the original 1913 turbines with more efficient stainless steel turbines.
Today, Keokuk Energy Center remains the largest privately owned and operated dam on the Mississippi River.  In addition to Lock and Dam No. 19, Lock and Dam No. 1, Lock and Dam No. 2 and the upper St. Anthony Falls dam also produce electricity on the Mississippi River system.

See also

Keokuk Rail Bridge
Keokuk-Hamilton Bridge

References

 This is a booklet Mrs. Diver wrote about the sounds heard from her Keokuk, Iowa, home as the dam was being built in 1913. Her husband was James Brice Diver, an engineer and bridge builder.

External links

Lock No. 19 - U.S. Army Corps of Engineers
Keokuk Area Convention and Tourism Bureau
Ameren Missouri Fact Sheet
Hugh L. Cooper speaks to MIT civil engineers Jan. 1915

Buildings and structures in Hancock County, Illinois
Buildings and structures in Lee County, Iowa
Mississippi River locks
National Register of Historic Places in Lee County, Iowa
19
19
19
Keokuk, Iowa
Dams in Iowa
Historic American Engineering Record in Illinois
Historic American Engineering Record in Iowa
Transportation buildings and structures in Lee County, Iowa
Tourist attractions in Lee County, Iowa
United States Army Corps of Engineers dams
United States power company dams
Gravity dams
Dams on the Mississippi River
Mississippi Valley Division
National Register of Historic Places in Hancock County, Illinois
Historic districts on the National Register of Historic Places in Iowa
Hydroelectric power plants in Iowa
19